In Greek mythology, Plouto or Pluto (Ancient Greek: Πλουτώ means 'wealth') was the 'soft eyed' Oceanid, one of the 3,000 water-nymph daughters of Titans Oceanus and his sister-wife Tethys.

Mythology 
Pluto was one of the "deep-bosomed daughters of Oceanus" who were the playmates of Persephone when she was abducted by Hades.

Notes

References
 Hesiod, Theogony from The Homeric Hymns and Homerica with an English Translation by Hugh G. Evelyn-White, Cambridge, MA.,Harvard University Press; London, William Heinemann Ltd. 1914. Online version at the Perseus Digital Library. Greek text available from the same website.
 The Homeric Hymns and Homerica with an English Translation by Hugh G. Evelyn-White. Homeric Hymns. Cambridge, MA.,Harvard University Press; London, William Heinemann Ltd. 1914. Online version at the Perseus Digital Library. Greek text available from the same website.
 Smith, William; Dictionary of Greek and Roman Biography and Mythology, London (1873).

Oceanids
Women in Greek mythology